Parson's chameleon (Calumma parsonii) is a large species of chameleon in the family Chamaeleonidae. The species is endemic to isolated pockets of humid primary forest in eastern and northern Madagascar. It is listed on CITES Appendix II, meaning that trade in this species is regulated. While most chameleon species from Madagascar cannot be legally exported, a limited number of Parson's chameleons can be legally exported each year from its native country.

Etymology
The specific name, parsonii, is in honor of British physician James Parsons.

Description

Among the largest chameleons in the world (usually considered the largest by weight, but shorter than the Malagasy giant chameleon which holds the title for the largest by length), C. parsonii males have ridges running from above the eyes to the nose, forming two warty horns. Calumma p. cristifer, from near Andasibe, reaches , and has a small dorsal crest. 

Several color variants are known within the range typically included in the nominate subspecies, but it is unclear if they are best considered morphs or different subspecies (at present, most consider them morphs). This includes "orange eye" aka "white-lipped" (generally considered typical of the nominate subspecies), where the male is relatively small and mainly green or turquoise but with yellow or orange eyelids; "yellow lip" where the male is somewhat larger and mainly green or turquoise, but with a yellow edge to the mouth; "yellow giant" where the male is very large and overall yellowish (strongly marked with dusky when stressed); and "green giant" where the male is overall green. Males of C. p. cristifer are overall green or turquoise. Females of both subspecies are smaller than the males and overall greenish, yellowish or brownish (often with an orange tinge).

Life span
The Parson's chameleon (C. parsonii ) is one of the longest-lived chameleon species with a highest minimum age of 9 years for males and 8 years for females. C. parsonii can reach an exceptional long lifespan in captivity. Longevity in the wild was estimated at 10 to 12 years and in captivity, animals of 14 years were recorded, which is unique among chameleons. The Parson's chameleon is particularly susceptible to the pressures posed by both sanctioned and unsanctioned wildlife trade and habitat fragmentation. This susceptibility is mostly attributable to a two year period of egg incubation and a 3 year development period before reaching sexual maturity.

Reproduction 
In captivity, females of Parson's chameleon lay up to 50 eggs per clutch; the eggs can take up to two years to hatch. In one instance, a healthy juvenile hatched after 781 days. The female's reproductive cycle allows for egg laying only once every two years. The hatchlings are independent once they dig themselves out of their underground nest. Once the nest is dug, eggs are laid, and buried, the female's parental obligations are concluded. Parents do not contribute any care towards the young.

References

Further reading
Boulenger GA (1887). Catalogue of the Lizards in the British Museum (Natural History). Second Edition. Volume III. ... Chamæleontidae ... London: Trustees of the British Museum (Natural History). (Taylor and Francis, printers). xii + 575 pp. + Plates I-XL. (''Chamæleon parsonii, p. 466).
Cuvier G (1824). Recherches sur les ossemens fossiles, où l'on rétablit les charactères de plusieurs animaux  les révolutions du globe ont détruit les espèces, Nouvelle édition, Tome cinquième, IIe Partie [= Volume 5, Part 2]. Paris: Dufour & l'Ocagne. 547 pp. + Plates I-XXXIII. (Chamaeleo parsonii, new species, p. 269 + Plate XVI, figures 30 & 31). (in French).

External links
 Calumma parsonii parsonii. adcham.com. Accessed 23-01-2009

Calumma
Endemic fauna of Madagascar
Reptiles of Madagascar
Reptiles described in 1824
Taxa named by Georges Cuvier